Aeromicrobium alkaliterrae is a Gram-positive, aerobic and non-motile  bacterium from the genus Aeromicrobium which has been isolated from soil in Kwangchun in Korea.

References 

Propionibacteriales
Bacteria described in 2005